The Emydinae are a subfamily of turtles in the family Emydidae.

Classification

The genera of the Emydinae remain unresolved, with Actinemys and Emydoidea being used in some publications.

Species

References

Bibliography

 
Reptile subfamilies

de:Neuwelt-Sumpfschildkröten#Systematik